Janet Wright (March 8, 1945 – November 14, 2016) was an English-born Canadian actress and theatre director. She was best known for her role as Emma Leroy on the Canadian sitcom, Corner Gas. She performed in many film and television shows, and she also acted in, and directed, dozens of theatre productions in Saskatoon, Vancouver, and at the Stratford Festival.

Early life and education
Wright was born in Farnborough, Hampshire, England. Wright grew up as the eldest of four siblings (the others being Susan, John, and Anne) who have all participated in Canadian theatre.

Career
Wright, along with her sister Susan, co-founded the Persephone Theatre company in Saskatoon in 1974. Wright's first husband, Brian Richmond, became the theatre's director. Wright later worked at the Vancouver Arts Club Theatre where she appeared in and directed more than 40 productions. She also appeared in several other productions in live theatre across Canada, and at the Stratford Festival in Ontario. Her theatre work eventually led to television and film roles in Canada and the United States.

In 1991, she performed at the Stratford Festival with her sisters Anne and Susan in Les Belles-soeurs, to positive reviews. In 1995, she was the first woman to play the title role in King Lear, for Canadian Stage in Toronto. Wright acted in the film Bordertown Café, for which she received a best actress Genie Award in 1992. In 2003 she was named best supporting actress in a dramatic program or miniseries at the Gemini Awards for her role in Betrayed.

From 2004 to 2009, she played Emma Leroy in the television series Corner Gas. In this role she won a 2006 Canadian Comedy Award for Pretty Funny TV Female. The show also won a Gemini Award in 2007.

Wright continued her involvement with the Vancouver Arts Club Theatre, directing several contemporary American plays, including Katori Hall's The Mountaintop and Ayad Akhtar's Disgraced in 2015. She continued acting from time to time at the Stratford Festival, lastly in 2011, when she played Ma Joad in The Grapes of Wrath.

Family
Wright's sister Susan was killed in a fire in 1991 in Stratford, Ontario, along with their parents, Jack and Ruth (née Preston) Wright.

In January 2004, Wright's daughter Rachel Davis (aged 23) was fatally shot while intervening for a stranger who was being beaten in front of the Purple Onion bar in Vancouver, B.C. In July 2006, the shooter was convicted of two counts of first-degree murder, five counts of attempted murder and five counts of aggravated assault. His first degree murder conviction triggered an automatic sentence of life imprisonment with no chance of parole until 2029.

Wright and her second husband, Bruce Davis, along with the rest of their family, started the Rachel Davis Foundation. The foundation presents an award to a young person (aged 17–23) who has demonstrated an outstanding act of kindness or compassion.

Death
Wright died on the morning of November 14, 2016, in Vancouver, aged 71, from undisclosed causes.

Filmography

Awards and nominations

References

External links
 
 Corner Gas official website - Janet Wright bio
 Rachel Davis Foundation

1945 births
2016 deaths
Canadian film actresses
Canadian Shakespearean actresses
Canadian stage actresses
Canadian television actresses
Canadian theatre directors
Canadian voice actresses
Canadian expatriates in England
Best Actress Genie and Canadian Screen Award winners
Actresses from Hampshire
Actresses from Saskatoon
English Shakespearean actresses
English television actresses
English theatre directors
English voice actresses
English film actresses
English emigrants to Canada
People from Farnborough, Hampshire
Canadian Comedy Award winners
Best Supporting Actress in a Television Film or Miniseries Canadian Screen Award winners